Gerard Patrick "Jer D" O'Connor (born 1940) is an Irish former Gaelic footballer who played as a half-back and midfielder for the Kerry senior team.

O'Connor made his first appearance for the team during the 1960 championship and established himself as a regular member of the starting fifteen between 1964 and 1967. During that time an All-Ireland medal eluded him, however, he won three Munster winner's medals and one National League winner's medal.

At club level, O'Connor played with the Ballydonoghue club and the Shannon Rangers divisional team. In 1964, Shannon Rangers won both the Kerry and the inaugural Munster championship. He went on to captain Kerry in 1965, losing to Galway in the All-Ireland Senior Final, having reached two previous finals as a Kerry player, winning neither.

References

 

1940 births
Living people
Ballydonoghue Gaelic footballers
Shannon Rangers footballers
Kerry inter-county Gaelic footballers
Munster inter-provincial Gaelic footballers